John Harry Larsen (27 August 1913 – 5 August 1989) was a Norwegian rifle shooter who competed in the 100 metre running deer event at the 1952 and 1956 Olympics. He won a gold medal in 1952 and placed eighth in 1956. At the 1952 Olympics he used a custom M95M Trombone Conversion in 6.5×55mm of which there were only 3 made. Larsen won seven gold medals at the ISSF World Shooting Championships in 1949–1954. His son, John H. Larsen, Jr., also became an Olympic rifle shooter.

References

1913 births
1989 deaths
Norwegian male sport shooters
Running target shooters
Olympic gold medalists for Norway
Olympic shooters of Norway
Shooters at the 1952 Summer Olympics
Shooters at the 1956 Summer Olympics
Olympic medalists in shooting
Medalists at the 1952 Summer Olympics
Sportspeople from Oslo
20th-century Norwegian people